"Seven Little Girls Sitting in the Backseat" is a song written by Bob Hilliard and Lee Pockriss.  It was recorded by Paul Evans (US No. 9) in 1959, and covered the same year by The Avons (UK No. 3).

Ingrid Reuterskiöld (Ninita) wrote lyrics in Swedish, as "Flickor bak i bilen", which was recorded by Siw Malmkvist in 1959. Her version peaked at No. 4 in 1960, according to the bestselling list in the Swedish music paper, Show Business.   The song was parodied by Country Yossi as "Seven Little Kids".

Synopsis
The song is told from the perspective of the driver, who is singing about seven girls in the backseat with Fred (never mind the implausibility of any backseat in a motor vehicle holding eight adults). The driver invites one of the girls to join him in the front seat, then asks how they like his triple carburetor, then offers to leave as the girls prefer Fred's company to his. Each time, however, he is told to pay attention to his driving and that they prefer to remain in the backseat "kissing and hugging with Fred."

Charts

Avons version
Entered the UK charts at No. 26 on 19 November 1959, peaking at No. 3 on 7 January 1960. It charted in the UK Top 10 for 8 weeks and in the Top 20 for a total of 10 weeks.

Paul Evans version

References

1959 singles
Siw Malmkvist songs
1959 songs
Songs with lyrics by Bob Hilliard
Songs written by Lee Pockriss
Paul Evans (musician) songs